Charles Dixon (22 July 1891 – after 1926) was an English footballer who played as a full back. He was a regular for North-Eastern League club Darlington before the First World War, and appeared in the Football League for Middlesbrough and Hartlepools United after it.

References

1891 births
Year of death missing
People from Sacriston
Footballers from County Durham
English footballers
Association football fullbacks
Darlington F.C. players
Middlesbrough F.C. players
Hartlepool United F.C. players
English Football League players
Place of death missing